Argentren S.A. was an Argentine private company that operated the Belgrano Sur and Roca railway services in Buenos Aires Province for about one year until the Government of Argentina rescinded the agreement with the company in March 2015. Since then, the Mitre and San Martín line are operated by State-owned company Operadora Ferroviaria Sociedad del Estado (SOFSE).

The company was part of the Emepa Group, a consortium that has also been operating the Belgrano Norte Line through Ferrovías since 1994.

History 
On May 24, 2012, the contract with TBA to operate the Mitre and Sarmiento lines was revoked by the Government of Argentina after the Once station rail disaster. Both lines were temporarily operated by UGOFE, a consortium formed by railway companies Ferrovías, Metrovías and TBA, although TBA would be excluded from it a few days later.

On February 12, 2014, the Government of Argentina announced that some companies would take over the lines operated by UGOFE. The consortium was officially dissolved.

Emepa Group also owned Ferrocentral, a railway company formed with Nuevo Central Argentino to run passenger services to Rosario, Tucumán and Córdoba cities of Argentina. The company was dissolved in November 2014, when the National Government took over the services, since then operated by SOFSE.

When UGOFE and UGOMS were dissolved, Corredores Ferroviarios (a company part of Grupo Roggio, which also owns Metrovías, a company that operates the Buenos Aires Subte and Urquiza line since 1994) and Argentren took over the Mitre / San Martín and Belgrano Sur / Roca lines, respectively.

On March 2, 2015, the Government of Argentina rescinded the contract with Argentren through its state-owned company SOFSE. The contract with the company had been signed in February 2014, committing Argentren to operate the Roca and Belgrano Sur lines.

Services operated

Notes

References

External links
 Official website (archived on February 28, 2015)

Defunct railway companies of Argentina
Railway companies established in 2014
Railway companies disestablished in 2015
Emepa Group
2015 disestablishments in Argentina
Argentine companies established in 2014
Rail transport in Buenos Aires Province